Kamar is a village in Khwahan Badakhshan Province in north-eastern Afghanistan.

References

External links
70°11′37″E:Kamar,Maps

Populated places in Khwahan District